The Annobón white-eye (Zosterops griseovirescens) is a species of bird in the family Zosteropidae. It is endemic to the island of Annobón, part of Equatorial Guinea and is listed as vulnerable by the IUCN.

Its natural habitats are subtropical or tropical moist lowland forests and plantations.

Description
The length is up to 12 cm with its wings up to 6.2 cm and its tail up to 2.1 cm long.

Distribution
Its distribution area is 17 km2.

References

Sources
 Otto Finsch: Das Tierreich. Lieferung 15: Zosteropidae. Friedländer, Berlin 1901.
 M. J. S. Harrison: A recent survey of the birds of Pagalu (Annobon). In: Malimbus. Ausgabe 11. April 1990, ISSN 0331-3689, S. 135–143.

Zosterops
Endemic birds of Annobón
Birds described in 1893
Taxonomy articles created by Polbot